Théo Mercier (born 1984) is a French sculptor, painter and photographer.  He is trained as a designer and self-taught as an artist, and interned with Matthew Barney in 2008. He also worked with Bernard Wilhelm. He uses collage and found objects in his work. Vogue described his work as drawing "on a surreal and dreamlike imaginarium populated by singular, mysterious and often monstrous creatures." His work has been exhibited at the Galerie Gabrielle Maubrie and the Fondation d'entreprise Ricard in Paris, France and Lille 3000.

References

External links
Official website
Théo Mercier remonte les Corridors du temps au château de Parentignat (in French)
Interview with Mercier in Fascinesh!on

1984 births
20th-century French painters
20th-century French male artists
French male painters
21st-century French painters
21st-century French male artists
French photographers
Living people
20th-century French sculptors
French male sculptors
French contemporary artists